More Greatest Hits is a compilation album by U.S. entertainer Connie Francis. The album features the songs from Francis' most successful singles on the American market from her 1959 hit Among my Souvenirs up to the date of the album's release in May 1961.

The album is notable for its change in track listing after its initial release. First pressings of the album featured Teddy as track five of the B-side. Due to copyright issues between MGM Records, Francis' own song publishing company Francon Music Inc. and the song's composer Paul Anka led to the replacement of Teddy by the Kadish Millett composition Valentino.

Valentino had never been a U. S. single but it had been a modest hit for Francis in Europe and was subsequently covered in the native languages of several European countries such as Germany (recorded by Caterina Valente as well as Angèle Durand) or The Netherlands (recorded by The Fouryo's). Valentino was also featured in different versions on the album: The stereo pressings contained the single vocal take of the song while the mono pressings contained the double vocal version where Francis harmonized with herself.

Track listing

Side A

Side B

References

Connie Francis albums
1961 greatest hits albums
MGM Records compilation albums
Albums produced by Ray Ellis
Albums produced by Norman Newell
Spanish-language compilation albums